Lu Yen-hsun and Jonathan Marray were the defending champions, but Lu chose not to compete this year and Marray chose to compete in Brisbane instead.
Oliver Marach and Fabrice Martin won the title, defeating Austin Krajicek and Benoît Paire in the final, 6–3, 7–5.

Seeds

Draw

Draw

References
 Main Draw

Doubles